Friedrich-Wilhelm-Lübke-Koog is a municipality in the district of Nordfriesland, in Schleswig-Holstein, Germany.

The municipality is located in and named after the polder, which was finished in 1954 and named in honour of Schleswig-Holstein's Minister-President Friedrich-Wilhelm Lübke , who had died the same year.

References

Municipalities in Schleswig-Holstein
Nordfriesland
Koogs